Arthur Steiner (31 March 1896 – 27 January 1984) was an Austrian writer. His work was part of the literature event in the art competition at the 1928 Summer Olympics.

References

1896 births
1984 deaths
20th-century Austrian male writers
Olympic competitors in art competitions
Writers from Vienna